In enzymology, a blasticidin-S deaminase is an enzyme that catalyzes the chemical reaction

blasticidin S + H2O  deaminohydroxyblasticidin S + NH3

Thus, the two substrates of this enzyme are blasticidin S and H2O, whereas its two products are deaminohydroxyblasticidin S and NH3.

This enzyme belongs to the family of hydrolases, those acting on carbon-nitrogen bonds other than peptide bonds, specifically in cyclic amidines.  The systematic name of this enzyme class is blasticidin-S aminohydrolase.

Structural studies

References

 

EC 3.5.4
Enzymes of known structure